The East Pennsylvania Railroad is a defunct railroad which operated in the state of Pennsylvania. It opened a line between Reading, Pennsylvania, and Allentown, Pennsylvania, in 1859. The Philadelphia and Reading Railroad, predecessor of the Reading Company, leased the line in 1869. As the East Pennsylvania Branch, the line was part of the Reading's through route between Harrisburg, Pennsylvania, and Allentown. The line was transferred to Conrail on the Reading's bankruptcy in 1976. It is now part of the Norfolk Southern Railway's Reading Line.

History 

The East Pennsylvania Railroad was chartered on March 9, 1856, as the Reading and Lehigh Railroad, but was renamed in April 1857. It completed a line between Reading and Allentown on May 11, 1859. The opening of this line created a through route between Harrisburg and New York City. Philadelphia and Reading Railroad, predecessor of the Reading Company, leased the line in 1869. The East Pennsylvania continued to exist as a company, and would be merged along with the Reading into Conrail in 1976, as a result of the Reading's final bankruptcy.

References 

Companies affiliated with the Reading Company
Defunct Pennsylvania railroads
Railroads transferred to Conrail
Railway companies established in 1856
Railway companies disestablished in 1976
1856 establishments in Pennsylvania